Eduard Aellig (born 11 January 1948) is an Austrian judoka. He competed in the 1972 Summer Olympics.

References

1948 births
Living people
Judoka at the 1972 Summer Olympics
Austrian male judoka
Olympic judoka of Austria
20th-century Austrian people